This is a list of gliders/sailplanes of the world, (this reference lists all gliders with references, where available) 
Note: Any aircraft can glide for a short time, but gliders are designed to glide for longer.

C

Cacák-Šolc
(Antonín Cacák & Lubomír Šolc / Členové PO MLL Trutnov)
 Cacák-Šolc Hela-Zbodlina

Cacho-Ontiveros
(Emilio Gil Cacho & Felipe García Ontiveros / P.L.A.V.I.A. / Escuela de Especialistas, Málaga)
 Cacho-Ontiveros Gurripato I
 Cacho-Ontiveros Gurripato II

Cadet Aeronautics
(Alex Dawydoff / Cadet Aeronautics)
 Cadet UT-1

Calvel
(Jacques Calvel)
 Calvel Frelon

Cambier
 Cambier I

Cambilargiu
(Emanuele Cambilargiu)
 Cambilargiu Goliardia

Canard Aviation AG
see Farner

Cañete 
(Captain of Engineers Antonio Cañete Heredia)
 Cañete Gaviota (Gull)

Canova
(Piana Canova)
 Canova FPC
 Canova PC-100
 Canova PC-500

CAP
(Companhia Aeronáutica Paulista)
 CAP Alcatraz

Caproni 
(Società Italiana Caproni)
 Caproni TM.2

Caproni Vizzola
 Caproni Vizzola A-10 Calif
 Caproni Vizzola A-12 Calif
 Caproni Vizzola A-14 Calif
 Caproni Vizzola A-15 Calif
 Caproni Vizzola A-20 Calif	
 Caproni Vizzola A-21 Calif
 Caproni Vizzola 1
 Caproni Vizzola 2
 Caproni Vizzola MF
 Caproni-Coanda 1908 glider

CARMAM
(Coopérative d'Approvisionnement et de Réparation de Matériel Aéronautique de Moulins)
 CARMAM M-100 S Mésange
 CARMAM M-200 Foehn
 CARMAM JP 15/34 Kit-Club (Jacquet/Pottier JP15/34)
 CARMAM JP 15/36 Aiglon (Jacquet/Pottier JP15/36)
 CARMAM JP 15-38 (Jacquet/Pottier JP15/38)
 CARMAM C.38
 CARMAM C.40

Carnegie Tech
 Carnegie Tech Flying Anvil

Cascade
(Cascade Ultralights Inc. / Vitold Kasperski / Steve Grossruck)
 Cascade Kasperwing I-80

Cases
(Francisco Cases Masia)
 Cases Libel-lula

Castel
(Robert Castello)
 Castel C.24
 Castel C.24 Casoar
 Castel C.24S
 Castel C.242
 Castel C.25S
 Castel C.30 Moustic
 Castel C.30S	
 Castel C.301S Ailette
 Castel C.3010
 Castel C.31P Aigrette
 Castel C.310P
 Castel C.311P
 Castel C.32
 Castel C.34 Condor
 Castel C.36
 Castel C.38
 Castel S.D.
 Castel Yanapour II

Castel-Mauboussin
 Castel-Mauboussin CM.6 Adour
 Castel-Mauboussin CM.7
 Castel-Mauboussin CM.8 Acro
 Castel-Mauboussin CM.8/13
 Castel-Mauboussin CM.8/13 Sylphe démotorisé
 Castel-Mauboussin CM.08R13 Cyclone
 Castel-Mauboussin CM.08R13 Sylphe II
 Castel-Mauboussin CM.08R13 Sylphe III
 Castel-Mauboussin CM.08R9.8 Cyclope	
 Castel-Mauboussin CM.8/15
 Castel-Mauboussin CM.10
 Castel-Mauboussin CM.17
 Castel-Mauboussin CM.24
 Castel-Mauboussin CM.71
 Castel-Mauboussin CM-88 Gémeaux				
 Castel-Mauboussin CM-88R Gémeaux V
 Castel-Mauboussin Jalon

CAT 
(Costruzioni Aeronautiche Taliedo)
 CAT 15
 CAT 20
 CAT 28
 CAT 28BP
 CAT TM-2

CAU
(Club Aéronautique Universitaire)
 CAU Frelon

Caudron 
(Société des avions Caudron)
 Caudron LEI
 Caudron C.800
 Caudron C.801
 Caudron C.810
 Caudron C.811
 Caudron C.815

Caux
(Jules Caux)
 Caux 1922 glider

Cayley 
(George Cayley)
 Cayley 1799 glider
 Cayley 1849 glider
 Cayley 1853 glider

CEA
(Escola de Engenharia da Universidade Federal de Minas Gerais – School of Engineering at the Federal University of Minas Gerais / Centro de Estudos Aeronáuticos da UFMG – Aeronautical Studies Centre UFMG)
 CEA 101 CB.1 Gaivota
 CEA 102 CB.2 Minuano

Celair
(Celair Manufacturing and Export / Peter Cellier & François Jordan)
 Celair GA-1 Celstar

Cener-Slanovec
(Dušan Cener & Marjan Slanovec)
 Cener-Slanovec KB-2 Udarnik Dušan Cener & Marjan Slanovec

Centrair
 Centrair 101 Pegase
 Centrair C201 Marianne
 Centrair SNC-34 Alliance

CERVA 
(Consortium Europeén de Réalisation et de Ventes d'Avions (CERVA))
 CERVA CE-75 Silene
 CERVA CE-78 Silene

Cessna
(Clyde Cessna)
 Cessna CG-2

CGA
(Club Genevois d'Aviation)
 CGA Vol-au-Vent

Champion
(Ken Champion)
 Champion Freedom Falcon

Chanute
(Octave Chanute)
 Chanute 1896 glider
 Chanute 1902 glider
 Chanute 1904 glider
 Chanute-Voisin 1907 glider
 Chanute Katydid
 Chanute Quadriplan
 Chanute-Herring 1896 glider
 Chanute-Huffaker 1901 glider

Chapeaux 
(Émile Chapeaux)
 Chapeaux 1922 glider
 Chapeaux CH-10
 Chapeaux CH-19
 Chapeaux CH-19C
 Chapeaux CH-20
 Chapeaux CH-21
 Chapeaux CH-23
 Chapeaux CH-46
 Chapeaux CH-56
 Chapeaux CX-19 Hirondelle
 Chapeaux CX-44-2
 Chapeaux-Durand CXD-18 Émile Chapeaux & Édouard Durand
 Chapeaux EC-19
 Chapeaux Le Moniteur
 Chapeaux VSBC Le Vautour Oricou
 Chapeaux Monoplan Portatif

Chard
(Keith Chard)
 Chard Osprey

Chardon
(Francis Chardon)
 Chardon Monoplan 1922

Chase 
(Chase Aircraft Company)
 Chase MS.1
 Chase MS.7
 Chase XCG-14
 Chase XCG-18
 Chase XCG-20

Chase-Sisley
(Robert Chase & Sisley)
 Chase-Sisley C100-S

Chilton 
(Chilton Aircraft Ltd.)
 Chilton Cavalier
 Chilton Olympia

Chinese gliders
see List of Chinese gliders

Chlup 
(Jaromír Chlup / Dílny PO MLL Olomouc)
 Chlup CH-2 Duha I
 Chlup CH-2 Duha II

Chrzanowski
(Chrzanowski Secondary School)
 Chrzanowski 1912 glider

Chyeranovskii
(Boris Ivanovitch Chyeranovskii)
 Chyeranovskii BICh-1 Parabola
 Chyeranovskii BICh-02 Parabola (AVF-15)
 Chyeranovskii BICh-03
 Chyeranovskii BICh-08 Treugolnik
 Chyeranovskii BICh-09 Gnome
 Chyeranovskii BICh-11
 Chyeranovskii BICh-12
 Chyeranovskii BICh-12 Parabola
 Chyeranovskii BICh-13
 Chyeranovskii BICh-13 Triangle
 Chyeranovskii BICh-14
 Chyeranovskii BICh-18 Human-powered ornithopter also flown as a glider with wings locked
 Chyeranovskii BICh-22

Ciani 
(Edgardo Ciani / SSVV – Sezioni Sperimentale di Volo a Vela Milano)
 Ciani EC 37/53 Spillo
 Ciani EC 38/56 Urendo
 Ciani EC 39/59 Uribel
 Ciani EC 40/62 Eventuale
 Ciani EC 41/64 Crib (Cribbio?)

Cijan 
(Boris Cijan)
 Cijan BC-1 Galeb Boris Cijan / Letov
 Cijan BS-2 Galeb II
 Cijan BC-6 KOBAC: Yugoslav two-seater trainer for rough fields 1953 - Boris Cijan
 Cijan Orel Boris Cijan / Letov
 Cijan-Landsberg Skakavac Boris Cijan / Letov
 Cijan-Obad Orao IIC Boris Cijan / Letov
 Cijan-Obad Orao Boris Cijan / Letov
 Cijan-Obad Orao II (Eagle II)
 Cijan-Obad Orao IIC (Eagle IIC)
 Cijan-Stanko Meteor 57 – Ikarus Avijaticarski – Boris Cijan & Obad Stanko
 Cijan-Stanko Meteor 60 – Ikarus Avijaticarski – Boris Cijan & Obad Stanko

Civil Aviation Department of India 
(Ministry of Civil Aviation (India) – Civil Aviation Department)
 Civil Aviation Department ATS-1 Ardhra
 Civil Aviation Department HS-1 Mrigasheer
 Civil Aviation Department HS-2 Mrigasheer
 Civil Aviation Department ITG-3
 Civil Aviation Department KS-1 Kartik
 Civil Aviation Department KS-2 Kartik
 Civil Aviation Department MG-1
 Civil Aviation Department Revathi
 Civil Aviation Department RG-1 Rohini
 Civil Aviation Department TS-2 Ashvini
 Civil Aviation Department TS-3 Ashvini
 Civil Aviation Department TS-4 Ashvini II
 Civil Aviation Department BS-1 Bharani

Clarke 
(T W K Clarke & Co.)
 Clarke 1936 primary
 Clarke 1910 glider
 Clarke Popular
 Clarke-Chanute
 Clarke-Wright 1909 glider

Christopher
 Christopher AG-1

Chrzanowski
 Chrzanowski School Glider

Chrzanowskiego
 Chrzanowskiego 1912 glider

Chyliński
(Tadeusz Chyliński)
 Chyliński HWL Pegaz –

Clarkson
(F. Clarkson)
 Clarkson 1930 glider

Clavé
 Clavé Goéland

Clément
(P. Clément)
 Clément 1909 glider

Clément
(Louis Clément)
 Clément Triplan

Cloudcraft 
(Cloudcraft Glider Co / Roger S. Dickson)
 Cloudcraft Dickson Primary
 Cloudcraft Junior
 Cloudcraft Phantom

Cody
(Samuel F.Cody)
 Cody n°1 glider

Colditz
(Colditz Prisoners)
 Colditz Cock

Collard-Piel
 Collard-Piel Compact

Corazzo 
(Aldo Corazza)
 Corazza 1904 glider
 Corazza 1907 glider
 Corazza Aerocicloplano

Cordas
(A.C. Cordas)
 Cordas SCS-1

Cornelius 
(1930: (George Wilbur) Cornelius Aircraft Co, Glendale CA, c.1935: Van Nuys CA, c.1940: Dayton OH. 1941: Cornelius-Hoepli Co.)
 Cornelius XFG-1
 Cornelius XBG-3

Cosandey
(Louis Cosandy & Alain Rocheblaye)
 Cosandey Pou Planeur
 Cosandy-Rocheblaye Pou P AR-1

Costǎchescu
(Traian Costǎchescu)
 Costǎchescu CT-2

Coupet-Guerchais
 Coupet-Guerchais glider

Cousin
(Joseph Cousin)
 Cousin 1909 glider
 Cousin Voilier

Coward
(Ken Coward)
 Coward Pacific D-8

CPV
(Centro Politecnico del Volo)
 CPV-1 Arlecchino

Cramlington
(Cramlington Aircraft Ltd.)
 Cramlington Cramcraft

Crown City
(Crown City Glider Club)
 Crown City Screaming Wiener

Cukurs
(Herberts Cukurs)
 Cukurs C-4 – Herberts Cukurs

Culver 
(Irvin Culver)
 Culver Dingbat
 Culver Li'l Dogie
 Culver Rigid Midget
 Culver Screaming Wiener

Curtiss
(Glenn Curtiss)
 Curtiss Flying Boat glider

CVT
(Centro di Volo a Vela del Politecnico di Torino)
 CVT-1 Zigolo
 CVT-2 Veltro
 CVT-4 Strale
 CVT M-100
 CVT M-200
 CVT M-300

CVV
(Centro Studi ad Ezperienze per il Volo a Vela)
 CVV 1 Pinguino
 CVV 2 Asiago
 CVV 3 Arcore
 CVV 4 Pellicano
 CVV 5 Papero
 CVV 6 Canguro
 CVV 7 Pinocchio
 CVV 8 Linate - 1945 unbuilt project
 CVV 8 Bonaventura

CYPA
(Construcciones y Proyectos Aeronáuticos / Enrique CORBELLA, Francisco ARRANZ MONASTERIO & Miguel GUINEA)
 CYPA-14
 CYPA-19

Cywiński
 Cywiński Lublin I – First Polish Glider Contest August 1923
 Cywiński Lublin II – First Polish Glider Contest August 1923

Czarnecki
 Czarnecki-Wroński Ikar (Jan Czarnecki & Kazimierz WRÓNSKI)
 Czarnecki-Jasiński Czajka (Jan Czarnecki & Mieczysław JASIŃSKI)

Czechowski
(J. Czechowski)
 Czechowski Śpiesz się powoli (hasten slowly) No.11 – Second Polish Glider Contest 17 May – 15 June 1925

Czerwiński
(Wacław Czerwiński)
 Czerwiński CW I
 Czerwiński CW II
 Czerwiński CW III
 Czerwiński CW IV
 Czerwiński CW 5 bis
 Czerwiński CW 7
 Czerwiński CW 8
 Czerwiński and Jaworski CWJ 
 Czerwiński PWS-101
 Czerwiński PWS-102 Rekin
 Czerwiński PWS-103
 Czerwiński WWS-1 Salamandra
 Czerwiński Sparrow – close copy of the W.W.S.1 Salamandra – de Havilland Aircraft Canada
 Czerwiński Robin – modified Sparrow – de Havilland Aircraft Canada
 Czerwiński WWS-2 Żaba
 Czerwiński WWS-3 Delfin
 Czerwiński-Jaworski ITS-II 
 Czerwiński-Shenstone Harbinger – Beverley Shenstone and Waclaw Czerwiński
 Czerwiński-Shenstone UTG-1 Loudon – Étudiants de L'Université de Toronto

Czerwiński
(Sergiusz Czerwiński - no relation to Wacław Czerwiński)
 Czerwiński 1 (1911)
 Czerwiński 2 (1927)

Cycloplane
(Cycloplane Co Ltd )
 Cycloplane A-1
 Cycloplane C-1
 Cycloplane C-2

Notes

Further reading

External links

Lists of glider aircraft